This is a list of submissions to the 30th Academy Awards for Best Foreign Language Film. The Academy Award for Best Foreign Language Film was created in 1956 by the Academy of Motion Picture Arts and Sciences to honour non-English-speaking films produced outside the United States. The award is handed out annually, and is accepted by the winning film's director, although it is considered an award for the submitting country as a whole. Countries are invited by the Academy to submit their best films for competition according to strict rules, with only one film being accepted from each country.

For the 30th Academy Awards, twelve films were submitted in the category Academy Award for Best Foreign Language Film. Documentary Torero, which represented Mexico, failed to get an Oscar nomination in the Foreign Language Film category, but was nominated for the Best Documentary Feature Oscar. Denmark's Annelise Hovmand became the first female director to have a film in the running at the submission stage. The titles highlighted in blue and yellow were the five nominated films, which came from France, India, Italy, Norway and West Germany. Italy won the award for Federico Fellini's Nights of Cabiria, a drama about a heartbroken, young prostitute.

Submissions

References

Sources
 Margaret Herrick Library, Academy of Motion Picture Arts and Sciences

30